Cardington is a civil parish in Shropshire, England. It contains 48 listed buildings that are recorded in the National Heritage List for England. Of these, two are listed at Grade I, the highest of the three grades, three are at Grade II*, the middle grade, and the others are at Grade II, the lowest grade. The parish contains the village of Cardington and smaller settlements including Broome and Gretton, and is otherwise almost entirely rural. Most of the listed buildings are houses, cottages, farmhouses and farm buildings, many of them timber framed and dating from the 14th to the 18th century. The other listed buildings are a church retaining some Norman features, items in the churchyard, a country house and associated structures, a public house, a former school, a former watermill and two pumps.


Key

Buildings

References

Citations

Sources

Lists of buildings and structures in Shropshire